The 1991 South Carolina Gamecocks football team represented the University of South Carolina as an independent team in the 1991 NCAA Division I-A football season finishing with a 3–6–2 record. The Gamecocks were led by Sparky Woods in his third year as head coach.

This was the Gamecocks' 21st and final season as an independent. South Carolina joined the Southeastern Conference for the 1992 season after joining the conference in all other sports on July 1, 1991.

Schedule

Roster
Bobby Fuller* QB
Wright Mitchell QB
Desi Sargent QB
Brandon Bennett* RB
Leroy Jeter* RB
Rob DeBoer RB
Terry Wilburn RB
Albert Haynes RB
Eddie Miller* WR
Robert Brooks* WR
David Pitchko WR
Asim Penny WR
Bralyn Bennett WR
Bill Zorr WR
Darren Greene WR
Mike Whitman* TE
Matthew Campbell TE
Boomer Foster TE
Roderick Howell TE
Mathew Campbell TE
Ernest Dye* OL
Kenny Farrell* OL
Jay Killen* OL
Antoine Rivens* OL
Rich Sweet* OL
Vincent Dinkins OL
Kevin Rosenkrans OL
Cedric Bembery* DL
Bobby Brown* DL
Marty Dye* DL
Troy Duke DL
David Turnipseed DL
Ernest Dixon* LB
Eric Brown* LB
Gerald Dixon* LB
Robert Gibson* LB
Keith Franklin LB
Joe Reaves LB
Keith Emmons LB
Toby Cates* DB
Jerry Inman* DB
Bru Pender* DB
Tony Watkins* DB
Frank Adams DB
Cedric Surratt DB
Norman Greene DB
Daren Parker P

References

South Carolina
South Carolina Gamecocks football seasons
South Carolina Gamecocks football